King's Highway 404 (pronounced "four-oh-four"), also known as Highway 404 and colloquially as the 404, is a 400-series highway in the Canadian province of Ontario connecting Highway 401 and the Don Valley Parkway (DVP) in Toronto with East Gwillimbury. The  controlled-access highway also connects with Highway 407 in Markham. Highway 404 provides access to the eastern edge of Richmond Hill, Aurora and Newmarket and the western edge of Whitchurch-Stouffville, in addition to the southern edge of Keswick.

Construction on the freeway began soon after the completion of the Don Valley Parkway, with the first section south of Steeles Avenue opening in 1977. Over the next twelve years, the Ministry of Transportation of Ontario (MTO) undertook a continuous construction program to build the freeway to Davis Drive in Newmarket. This was completed on October 24, 1989. Future proposals may one day result in an extension to southeast of Beaverton.

Highway 404 is one of several freeways in the Greater Toronto Area (GTA) with High-Occupancy Vehicle (HOV) lanes; the southbound lane was one of the initial projects in the province and opened on December 13, 2005. The northbound lane opened on July 23, 2007.

Route description 

There are 16 interchanges along its length, mostly of the Partial cloverleaf A4 configuration. Exit numbers on the freeway start at 17, suggesting that the length of the Don Valley Parkway was considered in distance calculations; until 2017, there were no exit numbers posted on the DVP.

A continuation of the municipal-controlled DVP, the Ministry of Transportation of Ontario (MTO) jurisdiction over the freeway begins as the opposing directions of travel diverge south of the Highway 401 interchange.
Northbound, two lanes from the DVP are joined by a third from the eastbound collectors of Highway 401. These narrow to two lanes before merging with a single lane from westbound Highway 401 immediately south of Sheppard Avenue. An additional two lanes from eastbound Highway 401 converge and form a separate carriageway with no access to Sheppard.
Southbound, the freeway is divided into two carriageways, both of which provide access to the DVP. The outer carriageway also provides access from Sheppard and to both directions of Highway 401, including the westbound express lanes, while the inner carriageway is intended for DVP-bound traffic. The HOV lane eventually merges with DVP-bound traffic, and also has an off-ramp via a tunnel to the Highway 401 westbound collector lanes.
To the east of Highway 404 is the Consumers Road office park. To the west and north of Sheppard Avenue is Fairview Mall, which has its own connection with the southbound lanes attached to the Sheppard interchange.

The highway continues directly north along the old Woodbine Avenue right-of-way to just south of Steeles Avenue. This section of the freeway is five lanes per direction (four general purpose lanes, one HOV lane near the central median), plus an auxiliary lane that emerges from an on-ramp of one interchange and then diverges at an off-ramp of the next interchange. Southbound, the HOV lane continues to the interchange at Highway 401. From just north of the Van Horne Avenue overpass, the leftmost northbound lane becomes an HOV lane. Alongside Highway 404 to the east is an industrial warehouse and commercial office area, while on the west is a suburban subdivision of North York.

At the interchange with Steeles Avenue which also includes a dedicated on-ramp from Woodbine Avenue (York Regional Road 8), the freeway enters the Regional Municipality of York where it diverges to the west before continuing north, running parallel to Woodbine Avenue. To the east are industrial units, while on the west are residential suburbs. This land-use persists north to the Highway 407 ETR junction, a multi-level combination interchange with two flyovers. At this point the freeway narrows and the central concrete barrier ends; a grass median taking its place between the opposing lanes. Immediately north of Highway 407, the freeway interchanges with Highway 7, and due to the close spacing of these two interchanges, the northbound off-ramp to Highway 7 is braided with the on-ramp from Highway 407 (and vice versa with the southbound ramps) to avoid weaving. As the freeway crosses Highway 7, the HOV lanes transition to standard through lanes, although as of 2020 construction is underway to extend the HOV lanes using the grass median. The freeway passes west of Buttonville Municipal Airport and then interchanges with 16th Avenue, and the close proximity to the airport's runways necessitates that this freeway segment is illuminated by low poles instead of the high mast lighting on the rest of the freeway.

The land-use density continues to drop, with the appearance of some open spaces and farms interspersed with industrial and commercial buildings. By 19th Avenue, just north of the Honda Canada headquarters in Markham, the land-use is agricultural on both sides of Highway 404. Highway 404 continues north, forming the eastern boundary of the municipalities of Richmond Hill, Aurora and Newmarket and the western boundary of Whitchurch-Stouffville. North of Wellington Street, the highway reduces in width to four lanes, which is its configuration north through East Gwillimbury. The route continues, passing east of the community of Sharon, eventually curving northeast and terminating at an at-grade intersection with Woodbine Avenue immediately south of Ravenshoe Road (York Regional Road 32).

History

Initial construction 

A freeway east of Highway 11 was planned as early as 1954, when the province extended Highway 48 south from Port Bolster. A large cloverleaf interchange was constructed with the Toronto Bypass, and plans formulated for a dual highway around the east side of Lake Simcoe, connecting with Highway11 near Orillia or Gravenhurst. This route was dropped when Metropolitan Toronto began planning for the northern extension of the DVP in 1957, as subdivisions encroached upon Woodbine Avenue north of Highway401. The six-lane expressway was to follow the alignment of Woodbine from its southern terminus at Lawrence Avenue to north of Steeles Avenue, where the Department of Highways (DHO) would continue the road as a "new King's Highway".

In 1959, the DHO announced that they would construct and maintain the new route once the DVP was completed to Highway401 and designate it Highway404.
The proposed route of the freeway was presented at a special delegation on December13, 1960 by Harold Barry, a representative of the department.
Design work started in 1973, and construction began following the awarding of a C$6.9million contract in March 1976.
Shortly thereafter, on April20, Ernest Avenue and Van Horne Avenue were closed to traffic at Woodbine.
The first section of Highway404 between Highway 401 and Steeles Avenue opened in late 1977, including the flyover ramp from southbound Woodbine Avenue.
The freeway was separated by a grass median with a steel box beam acting as a barrier between the lanes. Construction north of Toronto proceeded quickly, with the contract for the section from Steeles to Highway7 being awarded in 1976 and the section opening on November10, 1978.
The next extension, to Stouffville Road (then known as the Gormley Side Road), was opened ceremoniously on December9, 1980 by minister James Snow;
the segment north of Highway7 was four lanes wide.

The section of Highway404 north of Stouffville Road was the subject of considerable controversy when work began to clear the route on May15, 1981 before the completion of an environmental impact assessment. The Ministry of Transportation and Communications was charged with violating the newly enacted Environmental Assessment Act, which it contested came into effect after construction of the extension had begun.
Minister James Snow was charged with violating the act, and called upon to resign. The Minister did not resign, but paid a C$3,500 fine. Despite the issues surrounding it, the extension between Stouffville Road and Bloomington Road was opened ceremoniously on the morning of August10, 1982.

Construction on the segment north of Bloomington to Aurora Sideroad was already in progress by this point. It was opened to traffic in late September 1985. 16th Avenue, which had been widened from two to four lanes during the mid-1980s, received ramps connecting to the freeway south of that existing underpass.
Construction on the  section from Wellington Street to Davis Drive began in early 1986, and the section opened to traffic on October24, 1989 at 8:30am. This final segment cost $22.1million, ending the continuous construction program undertaken since 1973 at a cost of $83.3million.

Expansion 
Studies and environmental assessments into various extensions began almost immediately after the completion of the route to Newmarket in 1989; it would take over a decade for any northward progression to take place. The completion of the route to Davis Drive was met with scorn as traffic in Newmarket rapidly increased as the bedroom community grew with the new highway access. Municipal officials warned prior to the opening of the route that major traffic delays would be faced along Davis Drive. Then-mayor Ray Twinney began an immediate push to widen Green Lane – at that time an unpaved rural route – into a bypass of the town.
Traffic delays were also compounded at the southern end of Toronto, where drivers whom had previously made use of Yonge Street, Bayview Avenue or Leslie Street would shift to make use of the new freeway.

By 1992, York Region was moving forward with plans to expand Green Lane into a four lane road, while the province was urged to consider extending Highway 404 north to it, and eventually around the east side of Lake Simcoe. The province studied this and other options over the following years, before a formal announcement was made by Minister of Transportation Tony Clement on June 22, 1998 along with York Region chairman Bill Fisch. The plan called for an extension of Highway 404 north to Green Lane, and widening of Highway 9, the western extension of Davis Drive (now part of it after being downloaded and redesignated as York Regional Road 31 east of Highway 400) outside town, to five lanes between Highway 400 and Bathurst Street. At the time over 20,000 vehicles used Davis Drive on an average day.

In the interim period, work went into expanding the six lane freeway through Toronto and Markham. A combination interchange was built with the new Highway 407 ETR which opened in June 1997, which as a prerequisite required the realignment of some ramps from the nearby Highway 7 interchange. In early 1998, the MTO announced plans for two contracts to widen Highway 404 south of Highway 7. The first contract converted the grass median into an additional lane in each direction with a central concrete barrier between them, with the inner lanes to eventually be converted into HOV lanes. High-mast lighting was also installed, replacing the unique luminaires used on the freeway. The second contract would result in an additional lane in each direction on the outside the existing freeway south of Highway 407, making it ten lanes wide, with expansion of the southbound and northbound lanes completed in 2005 and 2007, respectively. In 2002, Highway 404 was widened to six lanes between Highway 7 and Wellington Road, using the right-of-way afforded by the grass median.

Ramps were added to connect Regional Road 73 (16th Avenue) with the segment of Highway 404 north of that junction, making it a full interchange. On June 19, 2003, Transportation Minister and Oak Ridges MPP Frank Klees opened the new ramps, with Thornhill MPP Tina Molinari also in attendance, with traffic permitted onto the ramp following the ceremony.

Starting in the late 1990s, improvements were made to the bottlenecked interchange with Highway 401. This involved the construction of a two-lane on-ramp receiving traffic from the eastbound Highway 401 express and collectors that would converge with Highway 404 northbound without access to Sheppard Avenue, while the existing single lane on-ramp for that same movement was retained for Highway 401 collector traffic to exit at Sheppard Avenue. In early 2004, construction began on a new ramp from the Highway 404 southbound HOV lane to the Highway 401 westbound collectors, with the ramp consisting of a curved tunnel beneath the Highway 404's southbound general traffic lanes. To accommodate the HOV ramp, the ramp for general traffic from Highway 404 southbound to the Highway 401 westbound collectors was realigned which also permitted a higher speed. On December 13, 2005, the southbound HOV lane was opened to traffic. This was one of the three original HOV lanes in Ontario; the other two HOV lanes were on Highway 403 in Mississauga.
Work on the northbound HOV lane began shortly thereafter, opening at 8:30 am on Monday, July 23, 2007.

Extension 
The MTO formally announced plans to alleviate traffic in Newmarket on August 28, 2000: a three contract project to widen and extend Highway 404. The first contract added an additional lane in each direction in the grass median from Major Mackenzie Drive to Bloomington Road. A second contract then extended those two lanes north to Aurora Sideroad. These two projects both began in the summer of 2001 and were completed in December. The third contract called for a four lane extension from Davis Drive to Green Lane and the reconstruction of Green Lane into a four-laned arterial road between Leslie Street and Woodbine Avenue.
This contract began shortly after the announcement in September 2000. The extension was opened to traffic on February 8, 2002 at a ceremony attended by York North MPP Julia Munro and York Region chairman Bill Fisch.

The first contracts were awarded later that year for the construction of the northbound bridge over Green Lane,
followed by two structures over Mount Albert Road, west of Woodbine Avenue, begun in late 2008 and completed in 2009.
By April 2011, the extension had been cleared and graded.
Completion was originally scheduled for December 15, 2012 with landscaping work to continue the following spring.
However, due to soil conditions and utility relocation issues, the project was delayed by nearly two years. The C$99 million extension opened on September 17, 2014.

Future 
On December 9, 2016, the MTO announced that the segment between Highway 407 and Stouffville Road would be widened from six to eight lanes, with the additional inner lanes to be used as HOV lanes. The project will also add a carpool lot at Major Mackenzie Drive, and replace the 16th Avenue and Rouge River bridges. Construction north of Major Mackenzie Drive started in 2017 and is expected to be completed in 2021, while construction south of Major Mackenzie started in 2019 and is expected to be completed in 2023.

Long term proposals by the province call for Highway 404 to be extended to Highway 12, between Sunderland and Beaverton. This extension would follow a new alignment to Port Bolster, east of which the freeway would incorporate the existing two lanes of Highway 48. It has drawn criticism from various environmental groups who claim it will only serve to accelerate urban sprawl north of Toronto.

Exit list

Notes

References

External links 

 Video of Highway 404 northbound in Greater Toronto
 Highway 404 Images @ AsphaltPlanet.ca

04
East Gwillimbury
Toronto highways
Transport in Aurora, Ontario
Transport in Markham, Ontario
Transport in Newmarket, Ontario
Transport in Richmond Hill, Ontario
Whitchurch-Stouffville